Agnes Hedengård is a Swedish hobby model who became noticed in 2015 because of being told she was "too big for the industry" and she recorded a YouTube video with her response which reached over 5 million views and was reported by a variety of news outlets. She was a runner up on Sweden's Next Top Model (cycle 7), a reality television competition for aspiring models.

References

Swedish female models
People from Arvika Municipality
1995 births
Reality modeling competition participants
Living people